Dustin Jinka (born 28 April 1986) is a South African former professional rugby union player whose regular position was scrum-half. In 2016, Jinka became the head coach of Swedish Allsvenskan side Hammarby.

Career

Youth and amateur rugby

Following his performances at club rugby level for university side  (and their second team, Victorians), Jinka was called into the  squad for the 2006 Under-21 Provincial Championship. He was named in their senior side for the 2007 Vodacom Cup competition, but was never involved in a matchday squad. He was once again included in the Western Province U21 side for the Under-21 Provincial Championship in 2007.

Jinka had a standout season with Hamiltons, being rated as one of their star players and helping the side win the National Club Championship in 2009, scoring 101 points. He was also subsequently voted as the National Club Championship Player of the Year for 2009.

Western Province

In total, he scored seven points in five appearances in the competition.

Blue Bulls

He made just one start (against the ) and three substitute appearances during the season.

During the 2011 Vodacom Cup, Jinka was included in the squad for all eleven matches in their season and made four starts and played off the bench on three occasions.

Jinka started the Blue Bulls' first four matches of the 2011 Currie Cup Premier Division season, but just made four more appearances for the remainder of the season and being an unused substitute six times.

Eastern Province Kings / Return to Hamiltons

Griquas

Jinka made a return to provincial rugby in 2014, when he joined Kimberley-based outfit .

References

South African rugby union players
Living people
1986 births
Rugby union players from Cape Town
Rugby union scrum-halves
Blue Bulls players
Griquas (rugby union) players
Western Province (rugby union) players
Hamilton RFC, Sea Point players